Georgia is a three-song EP by Brian Fallon, singer/guitarist of American rock band The Gaslight Anthem, released on April 16, 2016, through Island Records. It is a Record Store Day 2016 exclusive, limited to 2,000 pressings on 10" vinyl.

Track listing

Release history
Source: Record Store Day's official website

References

2016 EPs
Brian Fallon albums
Island Records EPs
Record Store Day releases